Legislative Assembly elections were held in Eritrea on 25 and 26 March 1952. In two constituencies, a tie in the original vote led to a second round being held on 12 May.

Electoral system
The elections were held under universal suffrage. In Asmara and Massawa candidates were directly elected in single-member constituencies, with Asmara having seven constituencies and Massawa two.

In the rest of the country, candidates were indirectly elected using electoral colleges, which were convened by chiefs.

Results
The Democratic Front was an alliance of parties supportive of the Federation Act, including the Muslim League, the Liberal Progressive Party and the Italo-Eritrean Party.

Aftermath
The Muslim League of the Western Province (MLWP)) held the balance of power between the two largest parties, the Unionist Party and the Democratic Front. Although the MLWP was politically closer to the Democratic Front, a rivalry between MLWP leader Ali Radaai and DF leader Ibrahim Sultan meant the two were unable to come to agreement. Instead a coalition was formed by the Unionist Party and the MLWP, with Unionist Party secretary general Tedla Bairu being elected President of the Assembly and MLWP leader Radaai being elected Vice-President on 29 April.

References

Elections in Eritrea
1952 in Eritrea
Eritrea
Election and referendum articles with incomplete results
March 1952 events in Africa